Nicolas Besch (born October 25, 1984) is a professional French ice hockey defenceman of Polish descent who currently plays for Boxers de Bordeaux of the Ligue Magnus. Outside of France, he has also played professional hockey in the Swedish Allsvenskan, the Finnish Mestis, and the Polish PHL.

He participated at the 2010 IIHF World Championship as a member of the France National men's ice hockey team.

References

External links

1984 births
Living people
Boxers de Bordeaux players
Brûleurs de Loups players
MKS Cracovia (ice hockey) players
French ice hockey defencemen
KTH Krynica players
Leksands IF players
Mikkelin Jukurit players
Nyköpings Hockey players
Rouen HE 76 players
KH Sanok players
Sportspeople from Le Havre
GKS Tychy (ice hockey) players
Vaasan Sport players